Johnson Building is a historic commercial building located at Clinton, Sampson County, North Carolina.  It was built about 1902, and is two-story, five bay by eight bay, brick building with Classical Revival-style details. The front facade features arched windows, brick corner pilasters, recessed brick panels, decorative metal cornice, and a raised parapet. The building was constructed following a fire that destroyed much of the Clinton commercial district.

It was added to the National Register of Historic Places in 2000.  It is located in the Clinton Commercial Historic District.

References

Commercial buildings on the National Register of Historic Places in North Carolina
Neoclassical architecture in North Carolina
Commercial buildings completed in 1902
Buildings and structures in Sampson County, North Carolina
National Register of Historic Places in Sampson County, North Carolina
Individually listed contributing properties to historic districts on the National Register in North Carolina